A caravan, travel trailer, camper, tourer or camper trailer is a trailer towed behind a road vehicle to provide a place to sleep which is more comfortable and protected than a tent (although there are fold-down trailer tents). It provides the means for people to have their own home on a journey or a vacation, without relying on a motel or hotel, and enables them to stay in places where none is available. However, in some countries campers are restricted to designated sites for which fees are payable.

Caravans vary from basic models which may be little more than a tent on wheels to those containing several rooms with all the furniture and furnishings and equipment of a home. Construction of the solid-wall trailers can be made of metal or fiberglass. Travel trailers are used principally in North America, Europe, Australia and New Zealand.

History
In Europe, the origins of travel trailers and caravanning can be traced back to the travelling Romani people, and showmen who spent most of their lives in horse-drawn caravans.
Samuel White Baker purchased an actual Gypsy caravan in Britain and shipped it to Cyprus for his tour in 1879. The world's first leisure trailer was built by the Bristol Wagon & Carriage Works in 1880 for Dr. William Gordon Stables, a popular author of teenage adventure fiction, who ordered a "gentleman's caravan". It was an  design, based upon their Bible Wagons, used by travelling preachers in America's Wild West. Stables named it Wanderer. He travelled around the British countryside in it and later wrote a book documenting his travels in 1885 called The Gentleman Gypsy. This moved the Duke of Newcastle to commission his own caravan, The Bohemian.

By the turn of the century, caravanning for leisure had become an increasingly popular activity. In 1901, the first dedicated caravanning club was established. The Camping and Caravanning Club (originally the Association of Cycle Campers) was founded by Thomas Hiram Holding, the father of modern camping. The Caravan Club was founded in 1907 with Stables as its vice president. Its stated aim was to "... bring together those interested in van life as a pastime... to improve and supply suitable vans and other appliances... and to arrange camping grounds". Caravanning gained popularity in North America in the 1920s.

Modern travel trailers come in a range of sizes, from very small two-berth trailers with no toilet and only basic kitchen facilities, to large, triple-axle, six-berth types.

Romani caravan
Caravans, particularly the vardo, have served both as a significant cultural icon and symbol of the nomadic Romani people. Until the early 19th century, Romani caravans served primarily as a means of transport and not as a domicile. At the beginning of the 19th century, more Romani people began to live in their caravans instead of sleeping in tents. The caravan offered greater protection from weather conditions and could be outfitted with modern amenities such as wood-burning stoves. Often, caravans were commissioned to be built at the request of newlywed couples and their families. The small-scale, pre-industrial methods of the builders and the labour-intensive nature of the building process meant that a family's caravan could take up to a year to build.

Standards 
Trailer caravan is defined in ISO Standard 3833:1977, Road vehicles – Types – Terms and definitions, term No 3.2.1.3.

North America

Travel trailer
In the United States and Canada, the history of travel trailers can be traced back to the early 1920s, when those who enjoyed their use were often referred to as 'tin can tourists'. As time progressed, trailers became more liveable and earned a new name in the 1930s and 1940s, which was the house trailer. In the 1950s and 1960s, the industry seemed to split, creating the two types that are seen today, that of the recreational vehicle (RV) industry and mobile home industry. Today travel trailers are classified as a type of RV along with motorhomes, fifth-wheel trailers, pop-up trailers, and truck campers.

Smaller travel trailers and pop-ups are still made with touring in mind. By design, they are lightweight and quick to set up or prepare for travel. Some exceptionally-light travel trailers can be pulled by a motorcycle or even bicycle. Fiberglass body construction entered the U.S. scene in 1971 with the introduction of the first U.S.-produced mini travel trailer, called the Playpac. Since then, moulded fiberglass trailers have gained more popularity due to many factors including durability, lightweight design, modern features and a modern nod to retro chic design. 

The Playpac, invented by Steven Whysel, was the answer to the needs of the growing horde of VW "Bug" and other small-car owners who wanted a hard-shelled camper, light enough to be pulled by a small car. It came with a private water closet, shower, and the ability to sleep six. Its ultramodern aerodynamic styling and domed skylight by the modernist industrial designer Toshihiko Sakow made it an instant hit. It was short-lived, however (1971–1973), as the first Arab Oil Embargo and the ensuing major slow-down of RV sales caused it to cease operations. The Boler travel trailer was developed in Canada in 1968, soon joining the Playpac in the U.S. fiberglass light-weight class. The Hunter and Amerigo travel trailers were also on the scene by then. As moulded fiberglass technology advanced, more companies entered into the market. Key moulded fiberglass innovations made the travel trailers more durable but also lighter which allowed for more luxury amenities.

They have most of the amenities of the larger travel trailers, but sleep fewer people.

Larger travel trailers are made with seasonal or full-time users in mind. These amenity-laden models can reach  or more, requiring a purpose-built tow vehicle, highway tractor or large truck or SUV. Multiple televisions and air conditioners are common in units of this size. Slide-out rooms and screen porches add to livability.

With all of the disincentives inherent in municipal zoning bylaws and building codes to affordable, ecological (off-grid) and compact housing solutions, travel-trailers offer a possibility for those considering an ecological full-time home or seasonal cottage. Travel-trailers are often acceptable on flood-plains, areas outside of urban growth limits, et cetera, where regular buildings are not allowed. Among the virtues of a trailer park are its light infrastructure, low ecological footprint, minimal land disturbance, abundant permeable surfaces (for stormwater drainage), and ease of site restoration.

Some specialized brands of the trailer, such as the hi-lo trailer, have an upper half (slightly larger than the lower half) that can be folded down over the lower half to a total height of about five feet for reduced wind resistance during travel; these otherwise contain everything other travel trailers have (except for a full-height closet).

Innovation in travel trailers is the hybrid travel trailer, combining the features of a pop-up and a hard-sided trailer. In its camping configuration, one or more bunks fold down from the side with canvas tent covers. When travelling, the bunks fold up, leaving four hard sides. Larger models allow the hybrid travel trailer to be used while "turtled"meaning with the sides up. The primary advantage of a hybrid travel trailer is it offers a greater space-to-weight ratio. A disadvantage is the tent ends are not insulated and are subject to heat loss and condensation.

In the United States, it is generally illegal for passengers to ride in a travel trailer, while in motion, unlike horse-drawn trailers and coaches. Triple towing (towing two trailers) is not allowed in some U.S. states, such as California, Alabama, Florida, or New York; however, triple towing is permitted in Texas if the combined length does not exceed .

Fifth-wheel trailer

A fifth-wheel is a travel trailer supported by a hitch in the centre of the bed of a pickup truck instead of a hitch at the back of a vehicle. The special hitch used for fifth-wheels is a smaller version of the one used on 18-wheeler trucks and can be connected by simply driving (backing) the tow vehicle under the trailer. Fifth-wheel trailers are popular with full-time recreational vehicle enthusiasts, who often live in them for several months in one place, using their pickup truck tow vehicle for local errands. A fifth-wheel trailer tows more securely than a traditional travel trailer because the hitch weight sits directly over the pickup truck's rear axle or tires. Since part of a fifth wheel sits in the bed of the pickup, it reduces the overall length of the vehicle-and-trailer combination while allowing the same room as a comparable-length travel trailer. Additionally, the hitch's location in the pickup's bed reduces the risk of jackknifing and allows for more maneuverability when backing. Because of the greater room available on the roads in North America, these vehicles are more popular in the United States and Canada than in Europe or other parts of the world. For uneven terrain, a gooseneck hitch is an option for fifth-wheel trailers.

The downside is that the hitch takes up room in the pickup truck's cargo bed regardless of whether the trailer is hitched or not. The hitch can be unbolted from the bed but this takes a lot more time and effort than the unhitch operation.

Off-road trailer
Off-road travel trailers, also called 4x4 trailers, tentrax, and jeep trailers, are built specifically for exploring the extreme backcountry without having the restriction of paved highways or gravel roads. These travel trailers are designed to handle rough terrain. Many off-road travel trailers are equipped with a tent and bed, a skid plate, large tires and long stroke Independent suspensions, lift kits, and articulation systems.

Toy hauler
Innovation in the travel trailer types is the "toy hauler" or "toy box". Half living area and a half garage, these trailers allow other, smaller vehicles to be brought to the countryside. A folding rear ramp gives access for motorcycles, all-terrain vehicles, personal watercraft or racecars. A generator provides power for the equipment.

Double-decker trailer
A double-decker trailer is a two-level travel trailer. When travelling the trailer is only as high as a regular trailer, but when set up it increases in height to two full levels. They are often used in motion picture production as portable dressing rooms.

United Kingdom

The National Caravan Council estimates that the caravan industry which includes motorhomes, touring caravans (caravans designed to be hitched to a car and towed to a site) and static caravans and mobile homes (caravans designed to be transported to a permanent site, where they are anchored to the ground) is now worth over £1bn (€1.5bn/US$1.7bn) to the British economy alone with the manufacture of caravans worth in excess of £650m (€975m/US$1.1bn). The growth in popularity of caravanning has been enhanced by improvements in caravan quality and caravan site facilities, making caravan holidays possible at any time of the year.

There are two main organisations that many caravanners join in the United Kingdom: the Caravan and Motorhome Club, established in 1907, and the Camping and Caravanning Club, established in 1901. Both clubs offer a range of services including exclusive club sites, preferential rates, advice, services such as insurance and community activities including regional and national rallies.

In the UK, caravan insurance is not a compulsory requirement but is recommended due to the high value of touring caravans. 

Under tax regulations, caravans are considered wasting chattel and are exempt from capital gains tax.

Australia

In Australia, camper trailers are common alongside the traditional caravan. Camper trailers differentiate themselves from similar products due to their ability to go off-road. They feature large water holding tanks, batteries for electricity and off-road suspension.

Europe

Amenities
A mid-range, modern travel trailer may contain the following features:

 Beds, some of which convert to daytime seating
 Electricity supplied by battery or external hookup
 Gas- or electric-powered refrigerator
 Gas- or electric-powered stove, oven and grill
 Gas- or electric-powered water heater
 Microwave
 Powered wheel mover system (integrated or clip-on) to enable parking once unhitched
 Audio player or video player (such as a radio, CD player, DVD player, digital audio player)
 Shower
 Television (with an aerial, satellite dish, or both)
 Toilet with removable blackwater (sewage) disposal tank and flush-water tank
 Heater
 Slide-outs, which extend the width of a room or space, such as a  dinette or bedroom extension

Travel trailers (especially North American ones) may also contain the following:

 Air conditioning
 Awning or screen room
 Washing machine and clothes dryer
 External barbecue points 
 Tow hitch stabilizers
 Separate wastewater tanks for greywater (wash water) and blackwater (sewage)

Reception
Due to the  maximum speed limit on single carriageways for caravans on the United Kingdom's crowded and often narrow roads, caravans are seen as a nuisance by some motorists. The motoring journalist and presenter Jeremy Clarkson is well known for his gleeful hatred of caravans, and has physically destroyed several of them on the BBC television programme Top Gear since the show's relaunch in 2002, leading to complaints from the caravan community.

Gallery

See also

References

External links 
 

Caravans and travel trailers